Francis Allman was a commissioned officer of the British Army and was born in County Clare, Ireland on 1 November 1780. He enlisted as an ensign in the Queen's Royal RegimentFoot with his brother John in 1794. He was active during the Peninsular War (1807–1814), and received a severe sabre wound to the head at Albuera which led to his capture by the French who held him prisoner until 1815. In 1807 he married Sarah Wilson in Gibraltar and by the time he emigrated to Australia they had three children.

Colonial career
On 30 April 1818 Allman arrived at Sydney in command of a detachment of the 48th Regiment. In 1821 the Governor of New South Wales Lachlan Macquarie decided to create a convict settlement at Port Macquarie, some 390 kilometres north of Sydney. Allman was appointed commandant and magistrate of the convict settlement which consisted initially of 41 soldiers and 60 convicts who had been selected for their 'good conduct'. They left Sydney on 17 March 1821 but on the voyage most of the Allman family's possessions were washed overboard causing them added hardship once they arrived at Port Macquarie. Allman and his family remained at Port Macquarie until April 1824 and over that time pioneered sugar-cane production at the outpost.

In the colony of New South Wales
Once he returned to Sydney he returned to his normal duties before retiring on half-pay in December 1824 and being appointed commandant at Newcastle. Two years later Governor Darling abolished this office and Allman decided to take up farming on his grant of 2560 acres (1036 ha) near Muswellbrook. By 1828 Allman was living in Wallis Plains with his wife Sarah, aged 41; John James, aged 16; Francis William, aged 14; Sarah, aged 12; Maria, aged 10; Harriet, aged 8; George, aged 6; Frederick, aged 1. He continued to serve as a magistrate and in 1832 was appointed police magistrate for the Illawarra region in New South Wales. In March 1834 he took up the same role in Goulburn and at Campbelltown in July 1836. In February 1843 he was appointed as magistrate at Berrima.

Later years and death
Even with these appointments Allman appears to have found it hard to get ahead in the Colony and much of his life was spent in efforts to improve the prospects for his family.  In June 1844 financial difficulties seemed to have forced him to resign his position. He retired to Yass, a town in south-eastern New South Wales where he died on 24 October 1860. He was buried with military honours in the Church of England cemetery.

Legacy
Captain Francis Allman Expedition Monument. Horton Street, The Town Green, Port Macquarie, 2444. Inscription . 'Near this place on 17 and 18 April 1821 were moored the vessels Lady Nelson, Mermaid and Prince Regent which convened the first detachment of troops and convicts to this District under the first commandant Capt. Francis Allman 48th Regt." JJ Allman, who was one Francis' sons, settled in the Yarrowich Valley in 1836 and was later joined by his brother Francis (jnr.). In 1840 they sold their occupancies to Mr. Todd and Mr. Fenwick. In April 1856 Francis Allman (jnr.) was appointed to be a "Sub-Lieutenant of Native Police".

References

External links 
 Captain Francis Allman 1780-1860 blog
 
 Colonial Secretary's papers 1822-1877, State Library of Queensland- includes digitised correspondence and letters written by Allman to the Colonial Secretary of New South Wales, including matters relating to the Moreton Bay settlement

1780 births
1860 deaths
English emigrants to colonial Australia
Explorers of Australia